Brooke Roberts is a New Zealand entrepreneur and businesswoman. She is a co-founder of the micro-investing platform Sharesies. Roberts was the joint winner of the 2020 New Zealand Women of Influence Award in the Business Enterprise section.

Biography
Roberts grew up in Manurewa (Auckland), Mount Maunganui and the United States and attended high school at Woodford House in Hawke's Bay. She completed a bachelor of commerce and administration at Victoria University and a master's in finance at Massey University. She started her career in Wellington, working in finance, product and marketing roles at AJ Park, Kiwibank and Xero.

In 2017, Roberts and six others co-founded Sharesies as an investment platform for New Zealanders.

In 2020, Roberts received a Distinguished Young Alumni Award from Massey University.

References

Living people
Year of birth missing (living people)
New Zealand Women of Influence Award recipients
Victoria University of Wellington alumni
Massey University alumni
People educated at Woodford House
People from Manurewa
New Zealand women in business
New Zealand businesspeople